John Clerk, Lord Eldin FRSE FSA (1757– 30 May1832) was a Scottish judge based in Edinburgh.

Life

He was the eldest son of Susannah Adam, the sister of John Adam and Robert Adam, and John Clerk of Eldin. He was born in April 1757 in Edinburgh.

Though originally intended for the Indian Civil Service, he was apprenticed to a Writer to the Signet. After serving his articles he practised for a year or two as an accountant, and eventually was admitted a member of the Faculty of Advocates on 3 December 1785.

He had an extensive practice at the bar. A keen Whig, on 11 March 1806 he was appointed Solicitor General for Scotland in the Grenville administration, an office which he held during the year that the ministry lasted. His practice at the bar had been for some time falling off, and his health had already begun to fail, when, on 10 November 1823, he was appointed an ordinary Lord of Session in place of William Bannatyne, Lord Bannatyne. Assuming the title of Lord Eldin, he took his seat on the bench 22 November; but his health was poor. After five years of judicial work he resigned in 1828, and was succeeded by John Fullerton, Lord Fullerton.

His father, his uncle George and he himself were friends of the geologist James Hutton.

He was elected a Fellow of the Royal Society of Edinburgh in 1784.

Clerk died unmarried at his house at 16 Picardy Place, Edinburgh, on 30 May 1832. He was buried with his ancestors in the Eldin vault in the Old Kirk of Lasswade, just south of Edinburgh.

His collection of pictures and prints was sold by auction at his house in March 1833; a serious accident occurred, the floor giving way.

References

Attribution

External links

1757 births
1832 deaths
Eldin
Solicitors General for Scotland
Fellows of the Royal Society of Edinburgh
Lawyers from Edinburgh
Paintings by Henry Raeburn